Madhur Milan is a 2000 Bengali romantic drama musical film directed by Tushar Majumdar and produced by Sajjad Production. The film stars Prosenjit Chatterjee, Rituparna Sengupta, Abhishek Chatterjee, Biplab Chatterjee. The music was composed by Babul Bose.

Plot 
Sunita, the young lady hails from a rich business family and Gopal the poor boy loves each other. Gopal is an excellent singer but struggling. Sunita's family is completely against their marriage.

Cast 
 Prosenjit Chatterjee as Gopal/ Babuji in past life
 Rituparna Sengupta as Sunita/ Phoolmoti in past life
 Abhishek Chatterjee
 Biplab Chatterjee as Banwari
 Chinmoy Roy
 Subhendu Chatterjee
 Gita Dey as Phoolmoti's grandmother
 Soma Dey
 Haradhan Banerjee
 Pallavi Chatterjee as Kamli

References

External links 
 
 Madhur Milan at Gomolo.com

Bengali-language Indian films
2000 films
2000s Bengali-language films
Indian musical drama films
Indian romantic drama films
Films scored by Babul Bose